This is the discography of American rapper Bad Azz from Long Beach, California.

Albums

Studio albums

Collaborative albums 
 Thug Pound (with Bizzy Bone) (2009)
 Haven't You Heard... (with LBC Crew) (2011)

Mixtapes 
 I'm Baaack and I Ain't Went Nowhere (with DJ Age) (2010)
 I'm Baaack and I Ain't Went Nowhere 2 (with DJ Age) (2012)

Singles

Guest appearances

References

External links

Bad Azz discography at Discogs

Hip hop discographies
Discographies of American artists